Volla may refer to:

Another name for the Norse goddess Fulla
Volla, Campania, a municipality in the Metropolitan City of Naples, Italy
Volla (comics), a fictional character who appears in Marvel Comics

People with the surname
Pierre Volla (born 1981), French equestrian

See also
Võlla (disambiguation)